Keith Richburg is an American journalist and former foreign correspondent who spent more than 30 years working for The Washington Post. He is currently director of the Journalism and Media Studies Centre of the University of Hong Kong. Since February 2021, he has been President of the Hong Kong Foreign Correspondents' Club.

Journalism
Keith Richburg is a native of Detroit, Michigan.  He attended the University Liggett School, the University of Michigan (BA, 1980) and the London School of Economics (MSc. 1985).

He served as a foreign correspondent for The Washington Post in Southeast Asia from 1986 until 1990; in Africa from 1991 through 1994; in Hong Kong from 1995 through 2000; and in Paris from 2000 until mid-2005.  He was Foreign Editor of The Post, and was chief of the New York bureau of The Post from 2007 until 2010.  He was a China correspondent for The Post based in Beijing and Shanghai from 2009 to 2012. He also covered the wars in Iraq and Afghanistan, riding a horse partway across the Hindu Kush, a journey he chronicled in The Post's Style section.

He is the author of Out of America, which detailed his experiences as a correspondent in Africa, during which he witnessed the Rwandan genocide, a civil war in Somalia, and a cholera epidemic in Democratic Republic of Congo. Richburg's book provoked controversy in the African American community due to its perceived criticism of Africans.

After the Post

In spring 2013, he retired from the Washington Post and took up several teaching roles, including teaching international reporting at Princeton University and as a Resident Fellow at the Harvard Institute of Politics.

During this period he also served as editor-at-large and a visiting professor at the University of Hong Kong’s Journalism and Media Studies Centre, and in 2016 became its director, upon the retirement of founder and long-time director Yuen-Ying Chan.

Foreign Correspondents' Club
On 13 February 2021, Richburg was unanimously (by the board) elected President of the Hong Kong Foreign Correspondents' Club. His selection came as media in Hong Kong were under great stress from the new National Security Law, including the closure a few months earlier of the city's leading newspaper, Apple Daily.

Books

References

External links
Richburg's home page
Transcript of PBS NewsHour appearance

1950s births
African-American journalists
American newspaper reporters and correspondents
Living people
Harvard Institute of Politics
University of Michigan alumni
21st-century African-American people
20th-century African-American people